Stéphane Nikiéma (born 1965 in Bordeaux) is a French former kickboxer, and 3-times French Muay Thai champion, 3-times European Muay Thai champion, 3-times World Muay Thai champion and finalist for the Lumpinee Stadium belt. Stéphane Nikiéma was born in Bordeaux to a half-Polish, half-French mother and a Burkinabe father. Nikiema became one of the best farangs who have fought in Thailand.

Titles and achievements
 Lumpinee Stadium belt Finalist
 WPKN European Champion
 3-times World Muaythai Champion
 3-times European Muaythai Champion
 3-times French Muaythai Champion

Fight record

|-  bgcolor="#FFBBBB"
| 2004-06-05 || Loss ||align=left| Morad Sari || Le Grand Tournoi || Paris, France || Decision ||  || 
|-
|-  bgcolor="#fbb"
| 2000-01-29 || Loss ||align=left| Orono Por Muang Ubon ||  NJKF Millenium Wars 1 || Tokyo, Japan || Decision (Split) || 5 ||3:00 
|-
! style=background:white colspan=9 |
|-  bgcolor="#FFBBBB"
| 1999-12-05 || Loss ||align=left| Dejpitak Sityodtong || Kings Birthday || Bangkok, Thailand || Decision || 5 || 3:00
|-
|-  bgcolor="#c5d2ea"
| 1999-05-00 || NC ||align=left| Neungtrakarn Por Muang Ubon || Lumpinee Stadium || Bangkok, Thailand || No contest || 3 || 
|-
! style=background:white colspan=9 |
|-
|-  bgcolor="#FFBBBB"
| 1999-02-27 || Loss ||align=left| Perry Ubeda || Muaythai Gala in Palais des Sports || Marseilles, France || TKO (Referee Stoppage) || 4 ||
|-
|-  bgcolor="#CCFFCC"
| 1998-12-05 || Win ||align=left| Neungtrakarn Por Muang Ubon || Kings Birthday || Bangkok, Thailand ||  ||  || 
|-
! style=background:white colspan=9 |
|-
|-  bgcolor="#CCFFCC"
| 1998 || Win ||align=left| Kengkai Sor Vorapin || Muaythai Gala in Marseilles || Marseilles, France || KO ||  || 
|-
|-  bgcolor="#FFBBBB"
| 1998 || Loss ||align=left| Kengkai Sor Vorapin || Muaythai Gala in Paris || Paris, France || TKO (Elbow/Cut) || 5 || 3:00
|-
|-  bgcolor="#c5d2ea"
| 1997-02-01 || Draw ||align=left| Moussa Sissoko || Le Choc des Champions || Paris, France || Decision Draw || 5 || 3:00
|-
|-  bgcolor="#CCFFCC"
| 1997 || Win ||align=left| Changpuek Kiatsongrit || Muaythai Gala in Paris || Paris, France || KO (Punches) || 3 || 
|-
|-  bgcolor="#c5d2ea"
| 199- || Draw ||align=left| Kengkai Sor Vorapin ||  ||  || Decision Draw || 5 || 3:00
|-
|-  bgcolor="#FFBBBB"
| 199- || Loss ||align=left| Kengkai Sor Vorapin ||  ||  ||  ||  || 
|-
|-  bgcolor="#CCFFCC"
| 1996 || Win ||align=left| Aurélien Duarte ||  ||  || Decision || 5 || 3:00
|-
|-  bgcolor="#CCFFCC"
| 1996 || Win ||align=left| Paul Briggs || Muaythai Gala in Australia || Australia || KO (Knee) || 2 || 
|-
|-  bgcolor="#FFBBBB"
| 1994-12-04 || Loss ||align=left| Nokveed Devy || Thailand || Chiang Rai City, Thailand || Decision || 5 || 3:00
|-
|-  bgcolor="#FFBBBB"
| 1993-12-00 || Loss ||align=left| Krongsak Sakkasem || Salle des Sports Marcel Cerdan || Levallois, France || Decision || 5 || 3:00
|-
! style=background:white colspan=9 |
|-
|-  bgcolor="#FFBBBB"
| 1993-06-04 || Loss ||align=left| Krongsak Sakkasem || Stade Pierre de Coubertin || Paris, France || Decision || 5 || 3:00
|-
! style=background:white colspan=9 |
|-
|-  bgcolor="#CCFFCC"
| 1992-06-20 || Win ||align=left| Mustapha Lakhsem || Salle des Sports Marcel Cerdan || Levallois, France || TKO (Gave up) || 3 || 
|-
|-  bgcolor="#FFBBBB"
| 1992 || Loss ||align=left| Changpuek Kiatsongrit || Thailand || Bangkok, Thailand || KO (Left Low Kick) || 4 || 
|-
|-  bgcolor="#CCFFCC"
| 1991-06-00 || Win ||align=left| Farid Rezzag || Muaythai Gala in Palais des Sports || Nanterre, France || Decision || 5 || 3:00
|-
! style=background:white colspan=9 |
|-
|-  bgcolor="#FFBBBB"
| 1990 || Loss ||align=left| Somsong Kiathoranee || Muaythai Gala in Halle Carpentier || Paris, France || KO (Liver shot) || 3 || 

|-
|-  bgcolor="#FFBBBB"
| 1989-12-24 || Loss ||align=left| Somsong Kiathoranee || Muaythai Gala in Paris || Paris, France || Decision || 5 || 3:00
|-
! style=background:white colspan=9 |
|-
|-  bgcolor="#CCFFCC"
| 1989-|| Win ||align=left| Youssop Sor.Thanikul ||  || France || KO (Knee to the head)||  || 
|-
|-  bgcolor="#CCFFCC"
| 1986- || Win ||align=left|  || Gala in Palais des Sports || Paris, France ||  ||  || 
|-
|-  bgcolor="#cfc"
| 1986- || Win ||align=left| Mustafa Yamali || Kick-Thai-Boxing Gala || Amsterdam, Netherlands || Decision  || 5 ||3:00 
|-
|-  bgcolor="#CCFFCC"
| 1986- || Win ||align=left|  || Gala in Salle Jappy || Paris, France || KO (Knee) ||  || 
|-  bgcolor="#FFBBBB"
| 1985-12-28 || Loss ||align=left| Orlando Wiet || European Muaythai Championship ||  || Decision || 5 || 3:00
|-
! style=background:white colspan=9 |
|-
|-  bgcolor="#CCFFCC"
| 1985 || Win ||align=left|  || French Muaythai Championship || France ||  ||  || 
|-
! style=background:white colspan=9 |
|-
|-
| colspan=9 | Legend:

See also
List of male kickboxers

References

External links
Best K-1 Website on the net
 biography link

1965 births
Living people
French male kickboxers
French people of Polish descent
French sportspeople of Burkinabé descent
Sportspeople of Burkinabé descent
Sportspeople from Bordeaux
Welterweight kickboxers
French Muay Thai practitioners